Gaytán or Gaytan is a variant of the more numerous Spanish surname Gaitán. Both are ultimately derived from, i.e. Hispanic versions of, the Italian masculine given name and surname Gaetano. Notable people with the surname include:

 Alberto Larios Gaytán, Mexican politician
 Ann Gaytan (born 1949), Belgian singer and poet
 Bibi Gaytán (born 1972), Mexican actress
 Chacho Gaytán (born 1969), Mexican composer
 Daisy Hernández Gaytán (born 1983), Mexican politician
 Daniel Gaytán (born 1970), Mexican singer
 Eddy Gaytán (1929–1999), Argentinian-Cuban accordionist
  Federico Michael Gaytan (born 1995), Hispanic entertainer
 Hildebrando Gaytán Márquez (1945–2006), Mexican politician
 Itzel Gaytan (born 1992), Mexican volleyball player
 Jorge Cardiel Gaytán (born 1924), Mexican basketball player
 José María de Orbe y Gaytán (1848–1933), Spanish politician
 Pedro Gaytán (1518–1588), Spanish soldier and writer
 Porfirio Gaytán Gudiño (born 1966), Mexican politician
 Rocío García Gaytán (1959–2015), Mexican politician
 Sergio Gaytán Luján (born 1972), Mexican musician and political researcher
 Carlos Gaytan (born 1970), Mexican chef

See also
Cajetan
Gaetano
Gaitán

Spanish-language surnames
Surnames of Italian origin